Sohal is an ancient name and current surname historically used in India and Pakistan of a Punjabi tribe of the Jat ethnicity. Notable people with the name Sohal include:

 Sohal Rai (born 2000), Indian Hacker
 Harry Sohal (1946–1994), Indian-born politician from Canada
 Naresh Sohal (born 1939), Indian born composer of western classical music
 Sunny Sohal (born 1987), Indian cricketer
Ishan sohal (born 1989), manager Indian overseas bank
 Maktoum bin Butti bin Sohal (died 1853), founder of the Dubai sheikhdom